Vilches is a municipality in the province of Jaén, Spain.

Vilches airports 

The nearest airport is GRX - Granada located 114.9 km south of Vilches. Other airports nearby include GRX - Granada Armilla (119.0 km south),  ODB - Cordoba (124.9 km west),  LEI - Almeria (180.6 km south east), AGP - Malaga (191.0 km south west).

Nearby towns 

Cabrerizas (4.7 km south west), Hortalanca (5.7 km north east), Arquillos (6.1 km east), Isabela (6.9 km north west), Arquillos el Viejo (6.9 km south east), Estacion de Vadollano (8.6 km south west).

Villages
Vilches 
 Guadalén del Caudillo, a village established by the Instituto Nacional de Colonización in the Franco era.
 Miraelrío

References

Municipalities in the Province of Jaén (Spain)